The Milford Flat Fire was the largest wildfire in Utah history.  It was started by lightning on Friday, July 6, 2007 at 3:45 pm near Milford, Utah.  The fire burned 363,052 acres (567 square miles) and caused large stretches of I-15 to be temporarily closed.  Many veteran firefighters had stated this was the fastest-moving fire they had ever seen.

On Saturday, July 7, smoke caused numerous wrecks on I-15, including a 5-car pile-up, and a fatal hit-and-run that killed 2 motorcyclists from California. The fire also caused 10 truckers to abandon their cargo trailers on the side of the road. A  stretch of I-15 was later closed. The fire crossed the freeway around Cove Fort that afternoon, causing it to be evacuated. The fire narrowly missed the local Chevron gas station, but claimed 2 garage-like structures near it, including the Dog Valley Trading Post, as well as a crew cab pickup truck left in a Park-and-Ride lot.

On Sunday, July 8, the fire slowed somewhat, reaching the  mark by evening.  The freeway was reopened, but later a  stretch was closed for 5 hours.  Also, FEMA announced the appropriation of federal funds to help fight the fire.  Some evacuated residents of Cove Fort returned to view the damage.

On July 9, Firefighters were going to backburn parts of I-15, but the winds changed, and the plans were canceled. More crews arrived, bringing the total personnel from 200 to about 300 firefighters.

See also
Wildfire
List of forest fires
Milford, Utah

External links
"Massive Wildfire Grows to "~KSL
"Cove Fort Residents Escape Just in Time"~KSL
"Huge Fire Closes Freeway, Forces Evacuations"~KSL

Beaver County, Utah
Wildfires in Utah
2007 wildfires in the United States
2007 in Utah